I Want to Marry You (Spanish: Me quiero casar contigo) is a 1951 Spanish comedy film directed by Jerónimo Mihura and starring Virginia Keiley, Fernando Fernán Gómez and José Isbert.

Cast
 Buenaventura Basseda 
 María Brú as Madre de Rosita  
 Rafael Calvo Gutiérrez 
 Rafael Casañes 
 Modesto Cid
 Ángel de Andrés as Andrés  
 Elena Espejo as Rosita  
 Fernando Fernán Gómez as Ramón  
 Sacha Goudine as dancer  
 Jorge Greiner 
 José Isbert as Padre de Rosita  
 Virginia Keiley as Laura  
 Concha López Silva as Tía de Rosita  
 Pedro Mascaró 
 Francisco Melgares 
 Manolo Morán as Roberto  
 María Nicolau as dancer  
 Luis Pérez de León as Gerente  
 Rosario Royo 
 Rosita Valero as Vedette

References

Bibliography 
 de España, Rafael. Directory of Spanish and Portuguese film-makers and films. Greenwood Press, 1994.

External links 
 

1951 comedy films
Spanish comedy films
1951 films
1950s Spanish-language films
Films directed by Jerónimo Mihura
Spanish black-and-white films
1950s Spanish films